Gomathiyin Kaadhalan is a 1955 Indian Tamil language film directed by P. Neelakantan and starring T. R. Ramachandran, K. Savithri and K. A. Thangavelu. The film is an adaptation of a novel of the same name written by Devan.

Plot
Gomathi is the daughter of Mullaivaasal and Rajan is the younger son of Sinnaveli Zamindar. There is a long-standing feud between the two Zamin families. Gomathi is interested in arts and she acts in dramas. Rajan, without knowing that she is their family rival's daughter, falls in love with her after viewing her acting in a drama.

Gomathi's father sends her and younger son Balu to Madras for studies. They stay in the house of family friend Dharmalingam. Sinnaveli Zamindar's elder son sends Rajan, also to Madras Dharmalingam's house to get himself trained as a responsible person. Rajan meets Adukkumozhi Ananthar in the train and becomes acquainted with him. Two thieves, Mani and Pakkiri also travel in the train. While Rajan goes to the door to send off his acquaintance, the thieves take his suitcase and disappear. Rajan, having lost everything, sells his watch and wanders about. He accidentally meets Dharmalingam and becomes Dharmalingam's driver giving his name as Ramu.

Gomathi and Rajan meet and exchange love. Rajan learns that Gomathi is the daughter of Mullaivasal Zamindar. He knows that there is a feud between his and her families. So he hides the fact that he is the younger son of Sinnaveli Zamindar.

Mani finds the diary of Rajan in the suitcase and, along with Pakkiri, goes to Dharmalingam's house impersonating as Rajan. They find the real Rajan employed there as a driver.

After many twists and turns Rajan's real identity is revealed and the thieves are caught with the brilliant and timely help of the young boy Balu. The two Zamin families forget their feud. Rajan and Gomathi get married.

Cast
The following list is compiled from the film's song book.

Male cast
 T. R. Ramachandran as Rajan
 K. Sarangapani as Dharmalingam
 K. A. Thangavelu as Mani
 Friend Ramasami as Pakkiri
 D. Balasubramaniam as Barrister Somasundaram
 R. Balasubramaniam as Mullaivasal Zamindar
 P. D. Sambandam as Chinnaveli Accountant
 V. R. Rajagopal as Babu
 K. D. Santhanam as Chinnaveli Zamindar
 Sayeeraman as Kokku
 Narayana Pillai as Layman Anandar
 V. P. S. Mani as K. T. Pillai
 S. S. Sivasooriyan as Moorthi
 Hariharan as Lawyer
 P. Kalyanam as Mullaivasal Accountant
 Master Ranganathan as Balu

Female cast
 Savithri as Gomathi
 T. P. Muthulakshmi as Ponnayi
 P. Susheela as Sundari
 Dhanam as Kalyani
 P. S. Gnanam as Parvatham
 S. R. Janaki as Chinnaveli Lady Zamindar 
 Saradambal as Bhagyam
 T. K. Pattammal as Friend
 Bala as Friend
Dance
 Sayee, Subbulakshmi
 Ragini
 Thangam
 Sukumari

Production
The film was produced by actor T. R. Ramachandran under the banner TRR Productions, and was directed by P. Neelakantan who also wrote the screenplay and dialogue. Lyricist Ku. Ma. Balasubramaniam was one of the assistant directors. The story is an adaptation of a novel by the same name written by Devan and was published as a series in Ananda Vikatan. M. K. Ramani, M. N. Appu and N. Meenakshisundaram did the editing. Cinematography was done by Nimai Ghosh. C. Raghavan was in charge of Art direction while K. N. Dandayudhapani and Sohanlal handled the choreography. Photography was done by R. Venkatachari.

Soundtrack
Music was composed by G. Ramanathan and the lyrics were penned by Puarakshi Kavignar Bharathidasan, K. D. Santhanam, K. P. Kamakshisundaram, Ku. Ma. Balasubramaniam and Ku. Mu. Annal Thango. Playback singers are Seerkazhi Govindarajan, Thiruchi Loganathan, A. M. Rajah, Jikki, P. A. Periyanayaki, P. Leela, (Radha) Jayalakshmi, A. P. Komala and T. V. Rathnam.

The songs Vanameedhil Neendhi Odum Vennilaave and Kongu Nattu Sengarumbe was recorded with both singers Thiruchi Loganathan and Seerkazhi Govindarajan and were published in 78-RPM records. But the version by Seerkazhi Govindarajan was only included in the film.

References

External links
 - Full-length feature film

1955 films
1950s Tamil-language films
Indian drama films
Films based on Indian novels
Films scored by G. Ramanathan
Films directed by P. Neelakantan
1955 drama films
Indian black-and-white films